RK Prilep 2010 (HC Prilep 2010) (Macedonian: РК Прилеп) is a handball club from Prilep, North Macedonia. It plays in the Macedonian Handball Super League. In the past this club was named as RK Tutunski Kombinat. As a part of this club RK Prilep 2010 have won the National Cup in 2002 and represented the country in EHF Challenge Cup and Cup Winner's Cup.The club has fall in financial crisis and after that collapsed. In 2010 the team was revived and started to play handball again.

History 
RK Tutunski Kombinat (HC Tutunski Kombinat) (Macedonian: РК Тутунски Kомбинат Бренд) was a team handball club from Prilep, Republic of Macedonia. The team won the 2002 Macedonian Handball Cup and had represented Macedonia in the EHF Challenge Cup and EHF Cup Winners' Cup.
After few years playing in the lower leagues, the club have won the Macedonian First Handball League in the season 2013–14. After long time in Prilep have returned the handball. RK Prilep have played his first season in the strongest Macedonian handball league. The club have prepared for his first season in the Super League, with few transfers. The biggest transfer was bringing Zlatko Mojsoski for Metalurg. He was playing for RK Prilep one season and after that he left the club. In 2014–15 season RK Prilep was 2nd on the table which gone the team in the play-off. In the play-off, in the league have joined Macedonia two biggest clubs: Vardar and Metalurg. In the play-off RK Prilep was not playing as well as the first part of the season and the result of that was the 6th place in the play-off from 6 teams. This result did not take RK Prilep to some of the European Cups. The next season RK Prilep will play in the Super League and instantly the club is on the 2nd position after the first half of the season.
In 2015-16 RK Prilep finished on the 4th place on the table. That guaranteed qualification in Challenge Cup, but he played in EHF Cup because the 3rd placed team RK Maks Strumica did not have enough founds and bankrupt. The draw for the EHF Cup decided RK Prilep to play against HC Pfadi Winthentur. The both matches against Pfadi, have been played in Prilep. At the end RK Prilep lost the two matches. First match finished with final score 19:42 and second with score 15:42.

Accomplishments

Domestic competitions 
 Macedonian Cup
 2002

European record

European competitions 
EHF Cup Winners' Cup 
 2002 - 4th round
 2003 - 4th round
EHF Challenge Cup
 2004 - 3rd round

Current squad
Squad for the 2022–23 season

References 
 https://www.facebook.com/RakometenKlubPrilep/
 http://setaliste.com.mk/tag/bozinovski-sign-for-rk-prilep/
 http://www.rkmetalurg.mk/en/prilep-nemokjen-pred-silata-na-metalurg/
 https://10bez10.com/vesti/sport/4031-chetvorica-igrachi-si-zaminaa-od-rk-prilep
 http://rk.redup.mk/en/metalurg-vecherva-go-dochekuva-prilep/
 http://24rakomet.mk/?p=3372
 http://www.time.mk/c/9762609cc1/rk-prilep-so-novi-dve-zasiluvanja.html
 http://tip.com.mk/zlatko-mojsoski-e-nov-igrac-na-rk-prilep/

Handball clubs in North Macedonia
Sport in Prilep